"Tonight" is a song written and performed by Christian singer-songwriter Jeremy Camp. The song was the second radio single released in promotion of his fourth studio album, Beyond Measure. The single reached the No. 1 position on Billboard's Hot Christian Songs airplay chart. This song is featured on the Digital Praise game Guitar Praise. A live version is featured on his 2009 live album Jeremy Camp Live.

Track listing
"Tonight" – 3:04 (Jeremy Camp)

2006 singles
Jeremy Camp songs
Song recordings produced by Ron Aniello
2006 songs
Songs written by Jeremy Camp